"Wearing My Rolex" is a song by British grime musician Wiley. Described as "grime-meets-electro" on BBC Radio 1Xtra, the song samples DSK's song "What Would We Do" and was released on 21 April 2008 by Asylum Records and Atlantic Records. The track was produced by Bow producer Bless Beats. "Wearing My Rolex" peaked at number two on the UK Singles Chart.

An a cappella gangsta-rap version of "Wearing My Rolex", performed by the main cast, featured in the original Royal Court Theatre production of Laura Wade's stage play Posh (2010). The song was ranked at number 284 in Pitchfork Media's list of the Top 500 Tracks of the 2000s.

Music video
The video features a group of women dressed as and behaving like foxes.

Track listings
Digital download single
 "Wearing My Rolex" (radio edit)

Enhanced CD single
 "Wearing My Rolex" (radio edit)
 "Wearing My Rolex" (club (extended) edit)
 "Wearing My Rolex" (Niteryders remix)
 "Wearing My Rolex" (Pirate Soundsystem bassline mix)
 "Wearing My Rolex" (Shoes remix)
 "Wearing My Rolex" (video)

Chart performance
"Wearing My Rolex" entered at number four on the UK Singles Chart. It rose to number three and eventually peaked at number two, behind "4 Minutes" by Madonna featuring Justin Timberlake and Timbaland during its fourth week at the summit. In total, the song remained in the top 100 of the chart for 22 weeks. The single also charted in Denmark, peaking at number 32 on the Danish Singles Chart on 25 July 2008 and staying on the chart for seven weeks.

Weekly charts

Year-end charts

Certifications

References

2008 singles
2008 songs
Asylum Records singles
Rolex
Songs written by Wiley (musician)
Wiley (musician) songs